Vincent T. Muscarella (born September 23, 1954) is an American politician who has served in the Nassau County Legislature from the 8th district since 1996. He previously served in the New York State Assembly from the 22nd district from 1991 to 1995. Prior to elected office, he was an attorney with Tomasone & Muscarella, LLC.

In 2021, he was elected Nassau County Family Court Judge from the 2nd District.

References

1954 births
Living people
Republican Party members of the New York State Assembly
Politicians from Nassau County, New York